Alfred H. Ogletree (February 5, 1930 – June 24, 2019) was an American baseball coach in NCAA Division I college baseball.

Early life
Ogletree was born in San Antonio, Texas. He attended school at Texas A&M University, graduating in 1952. Four years later, he earned a master's degree. He played in the minors for two years while also spending time in the Army as an officer for two years.

Career
He served as head coach at Dallas, Sul Ross State University, and the University of Texas–Pan American. He coached Dallas to an 82-45 record over seven years and coached Sul Ross State to a 50-46 record over three years, winning a NAIA District 8 North Zone championship with Dallas in 1964. His greatest success came with Pan-American, of which he served as head coach from 1969 to 1997.  He was inducted into UTPA's inaugural Athletics Hall of Fame. Ogletree went 1,084–618–1 record at Pan American.

Ogletree, hired by athletic director Jim Brooks, led Pan American to their first-ever College World Series appearance in the 1971 College World Series tournament. In his career with the Broncs, he led them to 12 appearances in the NCAA Tournament. The Broncs finished fourth overall that year. Ogletree was also selected as The Sporting News National Coach of the Year, Coach of the Year honors by the NCAA District VI, Texas Sports Writers' Association and South Plains Professional Scouts Association. On March 14, 1989, he won his 1,000th game in NCAA Division I against Miami University at home. This victory would later be honored with a plaque. In his first twenty seasons (1969 to 1989) coaching the Broncs, he led them to a season of .500 or better in each of those seasons, with only five losing seasons in 29 seasons. He has been inducted into the Austin High School Hall of Fame, Texas A&M University Hall of Fame, American Baseball Coaches Association Hall of Fame, Rio Grande Valley Hall of Fame, Central Texas Semi-Pro Hall of Fame, University of Dallas Hall of Fame, Sul Ross State University Hall of Fame and Texas Sports Hall of Fame. He was awarded a Presidential Pillar Award from the school in 2015.

Head coaching record

Personal life
Ogletree married Alice Joann in 1952, with the couple remaining married for 62 years, having five children before her death on May 21, 2014. Ogletree died June 24, 2019.

See also
List of college baseball coaches with 1,100 wins

References

External links
UTPA HOF The University of Texas – Pan American Athletics Hall of Fame

1930 births
2019 deaths
Military personnel from Texas
Baseball players from San Antonio
Dallas Crusaders baseball coaches
Sul Ross Lobos baseball coaches
Texas A&M Aggies baseball players
UT Rio Grande Valley Vaqueros baseball coaches